Scopula subperlaria is a moth of the  family Geometridae. It is found in Cameroon, Nigeria and Uganda.

Subspecies
Scopula subperlaria subperlaria (Cameroon, Nigeria)
Scopula subperlaria acutangula Swinhoe, 1909 (Uganda)

References

Moths described in 1897
subperlaria
Insects of Cameroon
Insects of West Africa
Moths of Africa